This is a list of cinemas in Singapore. All of Singapore's cinemas are fully digital, with the majority of them equipped with Dolby Surround 7.1 speakers.

Cinemas

Carnival Cinemas Singapore
Carnival Cinemas Singapore is a branch of the Indian cinema chain. It had acquired 2 theaters with a total of four screens in 2017.

Cathay Cineplexes 
Cathay Cineplexes is the third largest cinema chain in Singapore with 7 cinemas and 53 screens.

Eaglewings Cinematics
An independent cinema by retail and lifestyle company EagleWings Group.

Filmgarde Cineplexes
Filmgarde Cineplexes, a subsidiary of Jack Investment Pte Ltd, operates a single cinema with 6 screens at Leisure Park Kallang. It formerly operates another two cinemas at Century Square and Bugis+.

Golden Village 
Golden Village is the largest cinema chain in Singapore with 15 cinemas and 120 screens. A joint venture between Golden Harvest (HK) and Village Roadshow Pictures (Australia)

The Projector
The Projector is an independent cinema specialising in showcasing arts and indie films.

Shaw Theatres
Shaw Theatres is the oldest and second largest cinema chain in Singapore with 8 cinemas and 78 screens. It is the only operator to operate IMAX screens in Singapore.

WE Cinemas
WE Cinemas, formerly known as Eng Wah Cinemas, operates a single cinema with 10 screens.

Upcoming cinemas

Defunct cinemas

References

 
Cinemas
Singapore